Francis "Frank" William Woodward (1885−1941) was a New Zealand professional rugby league footballer who played in the 1900s and 1910s.

International honours
Frank Woodward won a cap for New Zealand during the 1910 Great Britain Lions tour of Australia and New Zealand, playing  in the 20-52 defeat by Great Britain at Domain Cricket Ground, Auckland on Saturday 30 July 1910, and represented New Zealand in 1911 on the tour of Australia, and represented Australasia on the 1911–12 Kangaroo tour of Great Britain.

References

1885 births
1941 deaths
Auckland rugby league team players
Australasia rugby league team players
Balmain Tigers players
Bay of Plenty rugby league team players
New Zealand national rugby league team players
New Zealand rugby league players
Place of birth missing
Place of death missing
Rugby league five-eighths
North Shore Albions players